Draper is a town in Denton County, Texas, United States. The population was 27 at the 2010 census.

The town contracts with the city of Argyle to meet its police, fire, and court service needs.

History
A woman named Geneva Helton and her husband decided to form an incorporated municipality to get around Denton County's liquor laws. The two then installed a sewer system and established a liquor store. Corral City incorporated in 1973. Afterwards doublewide trailers and recreational vehicles appeared in the city limits. Candace Carlisle of the Denton Record-Chronicle said that Corral City "prospered" for a decade, but after the early 1990s retirement of Geneva Helton's and the death of her husband, the town, in Carlisle's words, "began a slow decline. Soon, all that remained was a graveyard of rotting doublewides."

According to Carlisle, by 1993, "Corral City looked in every way like a vanquished 'ghost town'." James "Eddie" Draper became the mayor and owner of Corral City. Carlise said that to Draper, "it was a boomtown waiting to happen."

In October 2016, Corral City was renamed to Draper in honor of  former mayor James "Eddie" Draper.

Geography
Draper is located at  (33.100883, -97.225812). Draper is located halfway between Denton and Fort Worth. It is in proximity to Interstate 35W and Farm to Market Road 407. Most residents of Draper live in mobile homes; in mobile home parks, permanent structures are not allowed to be built.

Demographics

As of the census of 2000, there were 89 people, 29 households, and 20 families residing in the town. The population density was 2,022.5 people per square mile (859.1/km2). There were 31 housing units at an average density of 704.4 per square mile (299.2/km2). The racial makeup of the town was 91.01% White, 7.87% Native American, and 1.12% from two or more races. Hispanic or Latino of any race were 11.24% of the population.

There were 29 households, out of which 41.4% had children under the age of 18 living with them, 51.7% were married couples living together, 13.8% had a female householder with no husband present, and 31.0% were non-families. 17.2% of all households were made up of individuals, and none had someone living alone who was 65 years of age or older. The average household size was 3.07 and the average family size was 3.75.

In the town, the population was spread out, with 39.3% under the age of 18, 4.5% from 18 to 24, 34.8% from 25 to 44, 19.1% from 45 to 64, and 2.2% who were 65 years of age or older. The median age was 28 years. For every 100 females, there were 122.5 males. For every 100 females age 18 and over, there were 134.8 males.

The median income for a household in the town was $38,125, and the median income for a family was $38,125. Males had a median income of $28,750 versus $23,750 for females. The per capita income for the town was $14,161. There were 18.2% of families and 25.0% of the population living below the poverty line, including 53.8% of under eighteens and none of those over 64.

Culture
In 2008 Candace Carlisle of the Denton Record-Chronicle said, "In Corral City, neighbors share their homes and their lives with each other. They keep their RV doors open at all hours to celebrate the good times and mourn the hard times with their neighbors."

Education
The Draper area is located the Northwest Independent School District. Residents are zoned to Justin Elementary School, Medlin Middle School, and Byron Nelson High School. Before 2010 residents were zoned to Pike Middle School.

References

Dallas–Fort Worth metroplex
Towns in Denton County, Texas
Towns in Texas
Populated places established in 1973